Presidential Food Service provides worldwide food service, security and personal support to the president and first family of the United States. Additionally, it provides gourmet meals and supports catered functions and social aide dinners for visiting heads of state.

The Presidential Food Service was established in 1951, and is run by the United States Navy.

Presidential Food Service operates the White House Mess executive dining rooms, provides a carryout service, and provides complete catering coordination to the White House Complex.

It also provides logistics co-ordination for White House Mess personnel and valet services for presidential trips and events.

References

This article incorporates text from the public domain White House web site. The entry can be found at Presidential Food Service.

White House Military Office
Food and drink in the United States